The remains of the former Abbey of Notre-Dame de Clairefontaine are located in Wallonia near Clairefontaine, a Belgian hamlet belonging to the city of Arlon, 3 km from the Luxembourgish town of Eischen.

The valley has been inhabited since Roman times and castle Bardenbourg, in which amongst others Countess Ermesinde resided, saw several important personalities of its time. These included Pope Eugene III, who stopped there in 1147 with a group of 18 cardinals on a trip from Rheims to Trier. The Pope's entourage included Bernard de Fontaine, who became a saint. It was said that he had been told that someone in the lord of Bardenbourg's family was very ill. Thereupon he got water from a spring not far from the castle, and blessed the sick person with this water. The latter made a miraculous recovery, and this is said to be the origin of the name "Clairefontaine". The water is still said to have healing properties.

About a hundred years later, Ermesinde had a vision, apparently seeing the Virgin Mary, and had the Cistercian abbey built here. As the countess died in February 1247, it was her son Henry V the Blond who constructed the abbey. It was first mentioned in records in 1250.

The abbey was destroyed by French revolutionaries. This may be because the inhabitants of surrounding areas used the stones of the abbey to build their houses.

Around 1875 the Jesuits of Arlon built a new chapel on the place of the old abbey.

References

Literature
 Bisdorff, Georgette (2012). Clairefontaine, un site médiéval, archéologique et historique. Die Warte: Perspectives 19|2369, 14 June 2012, pages 10–12.
 Bulletin trimestriel de l'Institut d'Archéologie du Luxembourg, no 3-4, page 163-245, "L'abbaye cistercienne de Clairefontaine - Du rêve d'Ermesinde aux réalités archéologiques", Arlon, 2010.

External links
L'abbaye cictercienne from Paroisse Saint Martin 

Ruined Christian monasteries in Belgium
Christian monasteries in Luxembourg (Belgium)
Arlon